Suntar Airport  is an airport, and possible former air base, serving and located  north of Suntar, Suntarsky District, in the Sakha Republic of Russia. It is a fairly extensive airfield.

There is also a Suntar Khayata mountain range on the Kolyma Highway.

Airlines and destinations

References 

Soviet Air Force bases
Russian Air Force bases
Airports built in the Soviet Union
Airports in the Sakha Republic